Amir Gul Chhutto (born on 7 April 1990) is a retired Pakistani footballer who played as a goalkeeper for National Bank from 2003 to 2016. He made his international debut against Malaysia in 2008 and competitive debut on 4 April 2009 against Chinese Taipei in 2010 AFC Challenge Cup qualifications.

Honours

National Bank
National Football Challenge Cup: 2013

References

External links

Living people
Pakistani footballers
Pakistan international footballers
1986 births
Footballers at the 2010 Asian Games
Association football goalkeepers
Asian Games competitors for Pakistan